Hampton Hill may refer to:

United States
Hampton Hill Historic District, Connecticut
Hampton Hill (Richboro, Pennsylvania), a historic house in Bucks County

England
Hampton Hill, Hannington, Swindon, Wiltshire
Hampton Hill, London